Purple Noon is the fourth studio album by American singer Washed Out, released on August 7, 2020, by Sub Pop. It was produced by Washed Out and Ben H. Allen.

"Face Up", the album's lead single, was released on April 4, 2018, originally as part of Adult Swim's Singles Series. "Too Late" was released as the album's second single on April 9, 2020. The title, artwork, track listing and release date of the album were announced along with the release of a third single, "Time to Walk Away", on June 30, 2020.

Critical reception
Purple Noon received generally positive reviews, with a normalized score of 63 out of 100 on review aggregation site Metacritic. In a positive review of the album, Alex Hudson of Canadian entertainment publisher Exclaim! wrote that on Purple Noon, Washed Out "flirts with the chillwave sounds he's known for without too blatantly repeating himself." Writing for Under the Radar magazine, Scott Elingburg felt that Washed Out "sounds more assured and more interested in stretching his abilities as a singer to accompany his electro pop soundscapes," but described some of the lyrical content as clichéd. Zach Schonfeld of Paste magazine was critical of the album's direction, writing that "there’s nothing here that complicates or advances Greene’s sound, nothing that particularly stands out from the agreeably monotonous haze."

Track listing

Personnel
Credits adapted from the liner notes of Purple Noon.

 Ernest Greene – vocals ; production ; recording ; art direction
 Ben H. Allen – mixing; production
 Harold "HB" Brown – drums 
 Blair Greene – photography
 Dylan Lee – acoustic guitar 
 Lanning Sally – design

Charts

Release history

References

2020 albums
Sub Pop albums
Washed Out albums
Albums produced by Ben H. Allen